The 1944 Fresno State Bulldogs football team represented Fresno State Normal School—now known as California State University, Fresno—during the 1944 college football season. Fresno State was part of the California Collegiate Athletic Association (CCAA). However, the conference was in hiatus because of World War II in 1944. Since most colleges did not field a team in 1944, the Bulldogs played primarily against junior colleges and military teams. The team was led by first-year head coach Earl Wight and played home games at Ratcliffe Stadium on the campus of Fresno City College in Fresno, California. They finished the season with a record of zero wins and six losses (0–6, 0–0 CCAA). The Bulldogs were outscored 18–95 for the season.

Schedule

Team players in the NFL
The following Fresno State Bulldog players were selected in the 1945 NFL Draft.

Notes

References

Fresno State
Fresno State Bulldogs football seasons
Fresno State Bulldogs football